Henry Kirke Porter (November 24, 1840 – April 10, 1921) was an American businessman and Representative of the United States Congress for Pennsylvania's 31st congressional district.

Biography
Porter was born in Concord, New Hampshire.  In 1860, he graduated from Brown University in Providence, Rhode Island.  He also helped found the YMCA that year.  He attended the Newton Theological Seminary in Newton Center, Massachusetts.

In 1862, he enlisted in the 45th Regiment, Massachusetts Volunteer Militia, and was mustered out in July 1863.

He continued his theological training at the Rochester Theological Seminary in Rochester, New York, but in 1866 he was given a gift of $20,000 by his father, which changed the course of his life.

He invested that money with a partner, John Y. Smith, and formed the Smith & Porter Machine works.  They opened a small shop in Pittsburgh, Pennsylvania, which grew to become H.K. Porter, Inc. Porter served as president of the company.

He was President of the Pittsburgh YMCA from 1868 to 1887, and was President of the Western Pennsylvania Institute for the Blind in 1904.  He served in the United States House of Representatives in the 58th United States Congress from 1903 to 1905 as an Independent Republican.

He was a member of the Jekyll Island Club (aka The millionaires Club) on Jekyll Island, Georgia.

He continued as President of H.K. Porter, Inc. until his death at age 80 in Washington, D.C., and was buried in the Allegheny Cemetery in Pittsburgh.

References
The Political Graveyard
 Retrieved on 2008-02-14

External links

1840 births
1921 deaths
Members of the United States House of Representatives from Pennsylvania
American manufacturing businesspeople
Union Army soldiers
Politicians from Pittsburgh
Brown University alumni
American people in rail transportation
Politicians from Concord, New Hampshire
Independent Republican members of the United States House of Representatives
Pennsylvania Republicans
Pennsylvania Independents
Colgate Rochester Crozer Divinity School alumni
Burials at Allegheny Cemetery